Pellets are small particles typically created by compressing an original material.

Pellet or pellets may refer to:

People
 Alain Pellet (born 1947), French lawyer
 Gustave Pellet (1859–1919), French publisher of art
 Laurent Pellet (born 1970), Swiss judoka

Other uses
 Pellet (ornithology), a round ball of undigested matter that some bird species regurgitate
 Pellets (petrology), a form of carbonate sedimentary structure found in limestones
 Pellet (software), an open-source Java OWL DL reasoner
 Pellet (air gun), non-spherical projectiles fired from air guns
 Shot (pellet), projectiles for shotguns or other weapons

See also
 
 Pellet stove, a stove that burns compressed wood or biomass pellets
 William Pellett (1809 – unknown), English cricketer